Evans Rutto (born 8 April 1978 in Marakwet District) is a Kenyan long-distance runner, who specialises in road running events. He made the fastest-ever marathon debut by winning the 2003 Chicago Marathon in a time of 2:05:50. He won the London Marathon and a second title in Chicago the following year.

After 2004, Rutto's form dipped considerably and in 2006 he took time away from marathoning due to injury. He has not yet returned to competition, although his personal best still keeps him within the top-20 fastest runners of all time.

Career
His first major competition was the 1999 IAAF World Cross Country Championships and he finished in fifth place in the long race and helped secure a dominant Kenyan finish in the team competition. Rutto became an elite runner at the 10k to half marathon distances: he won the 2001 Beach to Beacon race and was the top Kenyan finisher at the 2001 IAAF World Half Marathon Championships with a run of 1:00:43 for sixth place.

He moved up to the marathon in 2003 and won the Chicago Marathon with a record debut time of 2:05:50, making him the fourth-fastest marathoner ever at the time (after Paul Tergat, Sammy Korir and Khalid Khannouchi). This was the fastest-ever time for a marathon debut and remains so – it also remains his personal best time.

He opened his 2004 season with a win at the London Marathon, beating Sammy Korir to the finish by half a minute. He returned to the Chicago course in October and defended his title with a winning time of 2:06:16 – over a minute and a half ahead of runner-up Daniel Njenga. These two times placed Rutto at the top two spots on the season's fastest marathons list for 2004.

His 2005 performances were considerably less successful as he only managed tenth place at the London Marathon, losing his unbeaten record of three straight victories. His fastest time of the year, 2:07:28, was only enough to bring him fourth at the Chicago Marathon. At the 2006 London Marathon he was in tenth place again and appeared in agony at the end of the race.

Rutto took time out from competitive running after a disappointing 2006, due to injury and personal problems.

He trains with Kimbia Athletics and is coached by Dieter Hogen. Rutto is married with three children, Winnie, Dennis, and Dieter (after Coach Dieter Hogen) (as of 2005). His father Kilimo Yano was also a runner, whose personal best at 10,000 metres was 29 minutes. He won the 2014 Mumbai Marathon losing out on the course record by one second and a US$15,000 bonus for it.

Personal bests

All information taken from IAAF profile.

Competition record

References

External links

Marathoninfo profile
Kimbia Athletics
Video interview

1978 births
Living people
People from Elgeyo-Marakwet County
Kenyan male long-distance runners
Kenyan male marathon runners
London Marathon male winners
Chicago Marathon male winners
Kenyan male cross country runners